The 1979 Ba'ath Party Purge (Arabic: تطهير حزب البعث) or Comrades Massacre (Arabic: مجزرة الرفاق) was a public purge of the Iraqi Ba'ath Party orchestrated on 22 July 1979 by then-president Saddam Hussein six days after his arrival to the presidency of the Iraqi Republic on 16 July 1979.

Six days after the resignation of President Ahmed Hassan al-Bakr and Hussein's accession to President of the Iraqi Republic, Regional Secretary of the party, and Chairman of the Revolutionary Command Council on July 16,1979, he organized a Ba'ath conference on July 22 in Al-Khuld Hall in Baghdad to carry out a campaign of arrests and executions that included Baathist comrades to consolidate Saddam's hegemony and increase his influence.

The list included most of the comrades who opposed Saddam Hussein's rise to power after Al-Bakr, and among these was the former president's secretary, Muhyi Abdul Hussein. Names of people were announced and they were taken outside the hall to be executed. Ba'athist propaganda at the time showed that they were convicted of conspiracy and high treason to the party.

Background

1979 Iraqi coup d'état 
On 16 July 1979, Saddam acted to secure his grip on power. Saddam staged a palace coup by forcing the ailing al-Bakr to resign "for health reasons." The ailing al-Bakr resigned under the threat of force, and formally transferred the presidency and chairmanship of the RCC to the "cherished comrade Saddam Hussein". Abdul-Hussein objected to the transfer of power. Saddam justified this purge based on a perceived conspiracy organized by the left military wing of the Baath-Party interested in unifying Iraq with Syria at the expense of Iraq.

Event 

Saddam hurriedly convened an assembly of party leaders on July 22. During the assembly, which he ordered to be videotaped, he claimed to have uncovered a fifth column within the party. Abdul-Hussein, broken after days of physical torture and under the threat of his family's execution, confessed to taking a leading role in a Syrian-backed plot against the Iraqi government and gave the names of 68 alleged co-conspirators. These were removed from the room one by one as their names were called and taken into custody. After the list was read, Saddam congratulated those still seated in the room for their past and future loyalty. Those arrested at the meeting were subsequently tried together and found guilty of treason. Twenty-two men, including five members of the Revolutionary Command Council, were sentenced to execution. Those spared were given weapons and directed to execute their comrades. 

Some of the victims are listed below:

Aftermath 
By August 1, hundreds of high-ranking Ba'ath Party members had been executed. On August 8, the Iraqi News Agency announced that twenty-one of the twenty-two Iraqis were executed by firing squad for "their part in a plot to overthrow Iraq's new president". The twenty-second man was condemned to death in absentia because he was "nowhere to be found", the agency said.  A tape of the assembly and of the executions was distributed throughout the country. "On an August afternoon in 1979, his face tense and somber, Saddam Hussein from the balcony of the presidential palace in Baghdad "informed a chanting crowd of 50,000 supporters "that he had just witnessed the punishment the state court had ordered for 21 of those men: They had been executed by a firing squad. The crowd cheered".

References

1979 in Iraq
History of the Ba'ath Party
Political and cultural purges
Political history of Iraq
Political repression in Iraq
Saddam Hussein